Ganan (also spelled as Ganaan or Kanan) is a Sino-Tibetan language of northwestern Myanmar. It belongs to the Luish branch, and is most closely related to the Kadu language of Myanmar.

Names
Ethnologue lists Ganaan, Ganan, Ganon, Genan, Kanan as alternate names.

Distribution
According to Ethnologue, as of 2007 Ganan is spoken in 24 villages of Banmauk Township along the Mu River by 9,000 people in Katha District, Sagaing Region, Myanmar. It is also located in a few villages in Homalin, Indaw, and Pinlebu townships (Ethnologue).

References

Huziwara, Keisuke 藤原, 敬介. 2012. Rui sogo no saikou ni mukete ルイ祖語の再構にむけて [Toward a reconstruction of Proto-Luish]. In Kyoto University Linguistic Research 京都大学言語学研究 (2012), 31: 25-131. 
Matisoff, James A. 2013. Re-examining the genetic position of Jingpho: putting flesh on the bones of the Jingpho/Luish relationship. Linguistics of the Tibeto-Burman Area 36(2). 1–106.

Sal languages
Languages of Myanmar